Major George Anthony Geoffrey Howard, Baron Howard of Henderskelfe, JP (22 May 1920 – 27 November 1984) was a British politician, soldier and media man.

Howard was a younger son of Geoffrey Howard and Ethel Christian Methuen, and grandson of the 9th Earl of Carlisle and the 3rd Baron Methuen. He was educated at Eton and Balliol College, Oxford and fought in the Second World War with the Green Howards, being wounded in Burma. In 1952 Howard was appointed to the office of Justice of the Peace for Yorkshire.

He was chairman of the Board of Governors of the BBC from 1980 to 1983 after being a governor for eight years. He was made a life peer 1 July 1983 with the title Baron Howard of Henderskelfe, of Henderskelfe in the County of North Yorkshire.

Howard married Lady Cecilia Blanche Genevieve FitzRoy (born 13 May 1922, died 1974), a daughter of Alfred FitzRoy, 8th Duke of Grafton, on 11 May 1949. They had four sons:

 Hon Henry Francis Geoffrey Howard (17 March 1950 –17 April 2008). He was unmarried.
 Hon Nicholas Paul Geoffrey Howard (born 25 April 1952), married, firstly, in 1983, to Amanda Nimmo, daughter of the actor Derek Nimmo. They divorced in 1990. He married, secondly, in 1992, to Victoria Barnsley. Both marriages resulted in children, a boy and a girl, respectively.
 Hon Simon Bartholomew Geoffrey Howard (born 26 January 1956, died 27 February 2022), married, firstly (in 1983; divorced 2000), Annette Smallwood. Married, secondly, in 2001, Rebecca Sieff. Twins, Octavia and Merlin, were born in 2002.
 Hon Anthony Michael Geoffrey Howard (born 18 May 1958) Married firstly Linda McGrady in 1985. Two daughters were born of this marriage before they divorced in 1997. Married, secondly, Deborah Ayrton-Grime in 2002.

Howard owned Castle Howard in North Yorkshire, which was televised in Brideshead Revisited in 1981. He died from cancer.

References

External links 
 History of BBC Chairmen

 

1920 births
1984 deaths
People educated at Eton College
Alumni of Balliol College, Oxford
Howard, George
Chairmen of the BBC
Howard of Henderskelfe
Howard, George
Howard, George
Howard, George
George Howard, Baron Howard of Henderskelfe
Life peers created by Elizabeth II